Eupithecia uinta is a moth in the family Geometridae. It is found in Colorado.

The wingspan is 19–22 mm for males and 18–21 mm for females. The forewings are pale greyish brown, with a prominent, elongate, black, discal dash. The hindwings are concolorous with the forewings, with slightly less brown scaling. Adults have been recorded on wing in June.

References

Moths described in 1956
uinta
Moths of North America